Valle del Rosario is a town and seat of the municipality of Rosario, in the northern Mexican state of Chihuahua. As of 2010, the town had a population of 263.

References

Populated places in Chihuahua (state)